This is the Cabinet of Uttarakhand headed by the Chief Minister of Uttarakhand, Harish Rawat from 2014–2017.

Council of Ministers

Here is the list of ministers:

References

Uttarakhand ministries
Indian National Congress state ministries
Indian National Congress of Uttarakhand
2014 establishments in Uttarakhand
Cabinets established in 2014
Cabinets disestablished in 2017
2017 disestablishments in India